Knut Uno Henning (11 September 1895, Stockholm – 16 May 1970) was a Swedish stage and film actor. 

Henning's parents were Karl Bernhard Henning and Eleanor (Ellen) Martin. His father owned a bakery factory.

Henning studied at the Royal Swedish Dramatic Theatre School between 1915–1917. After graduating he performed at the Royal Dramatic Theatre, Stockholm between 1918–1925 and returned there again between 1935–1965. Between 1929 and 1935 he was engaged by another Stockholm theatre, the Blanche Theatre. 
He made his film debut in 1919 in Rune Carlsten's A Dangerous Courtship and came to be involved in some 40 Swedish films and TV productions over his career. He had a leading role in the British silent era movie A Cottage on Dartmoor (1929).

In a memorable role, he played a cold and manipulative doctor in Hasse Ekman's film Take away (1948).

In 1925 he was chosen to recite the poem "Ring Out, Wild Bells" at midnight in the Skansen open air museum, a Swedish New Year's Eve national tradition.

He married Ragni Frisell (1896–1984) on 10 June 1926 in Stockholm. The actress Eva Henning is his step-daughter, Ragni Frisell's child by an earlier marriage to Edgar Wetlesen.

He died at 74 years old. Henning is buried in Norra begravningsplatsen in Stockholm.

Selected filmography
 1919: Ett farligt frieri 
 1925: The Lady of the Camellias 
1926: Only a Dancing Girl 
1926: Getting Married 
1927: The Love of Jeanne Ney (German: Die Liebe der Jeanne Ney)
1929: A Cottage on Dartmoor
1942: General von Döbeln
1948: Each to His Own Way
1954: Foreign Intrigue (television series)

References

External links 
 
 BFI, Uno Henning at British Film Institute website.

1895 births
1970 deaths
Swedish male film actors
Swedish male silent film actors
20th-century Swedish male actors

Burials at Norra begravningsplatsen